Östlicher Saalkreis ("Eastern Saale district") is a former Verwaltungsgemeinschaft ("collective municipality") in the Saalekreis district, in Saxony-Anhalt, Germany. It was situated east of Halle (Saale). The seat of the Verwaltungsgemeinschaft was in Landsberg. It was disbanded in September 2010.

The Verwaltungsgemeinschaft Östlicher Saalkreis consisted of the following municipalities:

 Hohenthurm 
 Landsberg
 Peißen

Ostliche Saalkreis